The 2018–19 North Florida Ospreys women's basketball team represents the University of North Florida in the 2018–19 NCAA Division I women's basketball season. The Ospreys, led by fourth year head coach Darrick Gibbs, play their games at UNF Arena and were members of the Atlantic Sun Conference. They finished the season 15–14, 9–7 in A-Sun play to finish in fifth place. They advanced to the semifinals of A-Sun Tournament where they lost to Liberty.

Media
All home games and conference road games are shown on ESPN3 or A-Sun.TV.

Roster

Schedule

|-
!colspan=9 style=| Non-conference regular season

|-
!colspan=9 style=| Atlantic Sun regular season

|-
!colspan=9 style=|Atlantic Sun Women's Tournament

See also
 2018–19 North Florida Ospreys men's basketball team

References

North Florida
North Florida Ospreys women's basketball seasons
North Florida
North Florida